Crater Lake is a lake in Klamath County, Oregon, United States.

Crater Lake may also refer to:

Places
Crater Lake (Colorado), a lake in the Elk Mountains
Crater Lake (Idaho), an alpine lake in Custer County
Crater Lake (South Shetland Islands), a lake in Deception Island, South Shetland Islands, Antarctica
Crater Lake, a lake near Cradle Mountain, Tasmania, Australia
Crater Lake (Te Wai ā-moe), a lake on the summit of Mount Ruapehu, New Zealand

Other uses
Crater Lake, a 1987 Deathlands novel

See also
Impact crater lake, a lake created by a meteor
Volcanic crater lake, including a list of lakes
Volcano Lake, a lake on Vancouver Island, British Columbia, Canada